Alfred-Alexandre Quentin (1 January 1827 – 6 February 1895) was a French classical trombonist.

Life 
Born in Cherbourg-Octeville, Quentin entered the Conservatoire de Paris, in Antoine Dieppo's class. He won the second trombone prize at the 1856 competition, and the first prize the following year. At that time, he was a member of the Musard Concert Orchestra, and soon afterwards joined the Orchestre de l'Opéra national de Paris.

Under the title Orchestration, traité d’instrumentation (Paris, l’auteur, in- 8°), Quentin published a manual intended above all, in his thinking, to make composers familiar with the knowledge of copper instruments used in the composition of symphony orchestras.

Quentin died in the 10th arrondissement of Paris at the age of 68.

Sources 
 François-Joseph Fétis, Arthur Pougin, Biographie universelle des musiciens et bibliographie générale de la musique, Paris, Firmin-Didot, 1881, .

References

External links 

1827 births
1895 deaths
People from Cherbourg-Octeville
Conservatoire de Paris alumni
French classical trombonists
Male trombonists
19th-century French musicians
19th-century male musicians
19th-century classical trombonists